Darren Edward Clark (born 6 September 1965 in Sydney, New South Wales) is an Australian retired sprinter who specialized in the 400 metres.

His personal best time of 44.38 seconds, achieved at the 1988 Seoul Olympics, is the current Oceanian record. This time would have placed Clark in second place in the 2008 Beijing olympics 400 m final. Clark also co-holds the Oceanian record in 4 x 400 metres relay with 2:59.70 minutes, established with teammates Bruce Frayne, Gary Minihan and Rick Mitchell at the 1984 Los Angeles Olympics.

Clark achieved fourth place in two consecutive Olympics, 1984 and 1988.

Clark took a break from the track in 1991, playing a season in the New South Wales Rugby League for the Balmain Tigers. While playing for the Tigers, Clark was billed as the "Fastest white man alive".

He returned to the track in 1992 and was selected for the Barcelona Olympic team, but was forced to withdraw due to an Achilles tendon injury.

Clark was inducted into the Sport Australia Hall of Fame in 2000 and the Athletics Australia Hall of Fame in 2014.

International competitions

References

External links
 
 
 
 
 
 

1965 births
Living people
Athletes from Sydney
Australian male sprinters
Olympic athletes of Australia
Athletes (track and field) at the 1984 Summer Olympics
Athletes (track and field) at the 1988 Summer Olympics
Commonwealth Games gold medallists for Australia
Commonwealth Games silver medallists for Australia
Commonwealth Games medallists in athletics
Athletes (track and field) at the 1986 Commonwealth Games
Athletes (track and field) at the 1990 Commonwealth Games
World Athletics Championships athletes for Australia
Sport Australia Hall of Fame inductees
Rugby league wingers
World Athletics Indoor Championships medalists
Medallists at the 1986 Commonwealth Games
Medallists at the 1990 Commonwealth Games